Villalba, originally known as Villa Alba, is town and municipality of Puerto Rico located in the central region, northeast of Juana Díaz; south of Orocovis; and west of Coamo. Villalba is spread over 6 barrios and Villalba Pueblo (the downtown area and the administrative center of the city). It is part of the Ponce Metropolitan Statistical Area.

History
Villalba was founded in 1917 by José Ramón Figueroa y Rivera and Walter McJones. Its current mayor is Luis Javier Hernández Ortiz.
By 1918, there weren't any highways connecting Villalba to its neighboring towns but by 1927 there was at least one.

Hurricane Maria passed through the area on September 20, 2017 and triggered numerous landslides in Villalba with significant rainfall. Bridges were destroyed and many areas where vital infrastructure was located were inaccessible. The entire electrical system was destroyed. Villalba's emergency operations center and an assisted living center were among the many buildings destroyed in Villalba. Villalba received 27.82 inches of rain. The mayor's stated “Our main need is oxygen. Many people depend on oxygen through artificial respirators that require electricity.".

The mountainous geography of Villalba made restoring electricity and water services extremely challenging. Chaplains, and religious leaders of all denominations, provided emotional support to all involved.

Subsequent to the hurricane, in 2018, Javier Hernández, the mayor discussed other options for electrical power, such as micro-grids, for Villalba, with the mayor of Hoboken, New Jersey, reminding him that recovery from such a powerful hurricane would take years. Architect Jonathan Marvel talked about his company's plans to build an off-the-grid, 41-unit building in Villalba on the one-year anniversary of Hurricane Maria.

Geography
Villalba is located in the central region of Puerto Rico, on a valley in the Cordillera Central. The highest point in the municipality is Cerro El Bolo at 3,526 feet (1,075 m) of elevation.
Guayabal Lake 
Toa Vaca Lake 
Toro Negro Forest Reserve

Barrios

Like all municipalities of Puerto Rico, Villalba is subdivided into barrios.

Caonillas Abajo 
Caonillas Arriba
Hato Puerco Abajo
Hato Puerco Arriba
Vacas
Villalba Abajo
Villalba Arriba
Villalba barrio-pueblo

Sectors

Barrios (which are like minor civil divisions) in turn are further subdivided into smaller local populated place areas/units called sectores (sectors in English). The types of sectores may vary, from normally sector to urbanización to reparto to barriada to residencial, among others.

Special Communities

 (Special Communities of Puerto Rico) are marginalized communities whose citizens are experiencing a certain amount of social exclusion. A map shows these communities occur in nearly every municipality of the commonwealth. Of the 742 places that were on the list in 2014, the following barrios, communities, sectors, or neighborhoods were in Villalba: Chino neighborhood, Cooperativa neighborhood, Hato Puerco Arriba, Apeaderos, Sector Cubones in Caonillas Arriba, Palmarejo in Villalba Arriba, Céspedes in Pino, Cerro Gordo and Sector El Semil in Villalba Arriba.

Energy consortium
An Energy Consortium was signed in late February, 2019 by the mayors of Villalba, Orocovis, Morovis, Ciales and Barranquitas municipalities. The consortium is the first of its kind for the island. It is intended to have municipalities work together to safeguard their communities, in the event of a catastrophe, by creating resilient, and efficient energy networks with backups.

Demographics

Tourism

Landmarks and places of interest
 Walter McK Jones School
 Guayabal Lake
 La Corona Hill
 Toa Vaca Lake 
Toro Negro State Forest
 Biblioteca Pública 
 Centro de Bellas Artes Adrian Rosado
 Iglesia Católica Nuestra Señora del Carmen

Economy

Agriculture
Coffee, green pigeon peas.

Industry
Manufacturing of aluminum packaging and electrical and electronic machinery, nutritional products, medical devices, and others.

Culture

Festivals and events
Villalba celebrates its patron saint festival in July. The  is a religious and cultural celebration that generally features parades, games, artisans, amusement rides, regional food, and live entertainment.

Other festivals and events celebrated in Villalba include:
 Puerto Rico Marathon - July 
 Areyto Festival - November 
 Carlos Báez Marathon - December
 - November

In 2017, Villalba celebrated the 100th year of its founding.

Government

All municipalities in Puerto Rico are administered by a mayor, elected every four years. Waldemar Rivera Torres (of the Popular Democratic Party) served as mayor since 2005 to 2012. The current mayor is Javier (Javi) Hernández who was elected in 2013.

The city belongs to the Puerto Rico Senatorial district VI, which is represented by two senators. In 2012, Miguel Pereira Castillo and Angel M. Rodríguez were elected as District Senators.

Symbols
The  has an official flag and coat of arms.

Flag
Four horizontal, unequal stripes in width, that from top to bottom have the following order: green, white, green and yellow. In the immediate side to the flagstaff, in the superior stripe, appears, in white color, the star of the shield.

Coat of arms
On a green background, representing land, a 19th-century villa, reflected by six homes and a church in silver and red, the church is adorned with the shield of Carmelites, and a white star prominently displays and shines over the villa. Around its border are five fig leaves. Atop are three golden towers.

Transportation 

In 1918, Villalba was not yet connected to neighboring towns or municipalities. By 1927, Villalba was connected to Juana Díaz, and other neighboring municipalities with Puerto Rico Highway 149. 

There are 23 bridges in Villalba.

Education
 Villalba School District (Puerto Rico Department of Education)
 Puerto Rico Criminal Justice College- Villalba Campus (Puerto Rico Police Academy)

Gallery

See also

List of Puerto Ricans
History of Puerto Rico
Did you know-Puerto Rico?

References

External links
 Welcome to Puerto Rico! Villalba

 
Municipalities of Puerto Rico
Populated places established in 1917
Ponce metropolitan area
Energy in Puerto Rico